Ochsenhausen Abbey (formerly Ochsenhausen Priory;  or ) was a Benedictine monastery in Ochsenhausen in the district of Biberach in Baden-Württemberg, Germany.

History 
The traditional story of the foundation, in which there may be some elements of truth, is that in the 9th century there was a nunnery here called "Hohenhusen", which was abandoned at the time of the Hungarian invasions in the early 10th century. A ploughing ox later turned up a chest of valuables buried by the nuns before their flight, and the monastery of Ochsenhausen was founded on that spot.

The first Abbey Church of Ochsenhausen was in fact dedicated in 1093. The monastery was initially a priory of St. Blaise's Abbey in the Black Forest, but gained the status of an independent abbey in 1391. In 1495 it became Reichsfrei (territorially independent).

The abbey was secularised in 1803 and in 1806 its territories were absorbed into the Kingdom of Württemberg.

Much of the buildings still survive. They were extensively refurbished in the Baroque style, so much so that Ochsenhausen is sometimes referred to as "Himmelreich des Barocks" ("Baroque heaven"). The   is accommodated in part of them. The former abbey church is now the parish church of St. George's.

Images

See also
Lordship of Winneburg and Beilstein

References

External links 

  Ochsenhausen Town Website

Monasteries in Baden-Württemberg
Benedictine monasteries in Germany
Christian monasteries established in the 11th century
Swabian Circle
Imperial abbeys disestablished in 1802–03
Biberach (district)